Siliguri Town  is one of the railway stations that serve Siliguri in Darjeeling district in the Indian state of West Bengal. The other important stations are: Siliguri Junction, Bagdogra, Matigara and New Jalpaiguri Junction. This is a small station consisting of three platforms, among them two broad-gauge platforms and one narrow-gauge platform. This station is located almost at the centre of the city. It was opened in 1880.

History

In 1878, the railway line from Calcutta (later called Sealdah) station to Siliguri was in two stages –  broad gauge from Calcutta to Damookeah Ghat, on the southern bank of the Padma, across the river in a ferry and then  to Siliguri. In 1881, the  narrow-gauge line from Siliguri to Darjeeling was added. In 1926, with the Hardinge Bridge in position, the entire Calcutta–Siliguri line was converted to  broad gauge and in 1947, following the partition of India the line was severed, as a major portion of the line ran through East Pakistan.

In the post-partition era, with makeshift arrangements via  and  being metre gauge and narrow gauge, the focus shifted in 1949 to a new Siliguri Junction railway station and later still, in 1961 to the new broad-gauge station at New Jalpaiguri.

Trains
Mostly unreserved trains are available at this station.

References

External links
Trains at Siliguri Town railway station

 Railway stations in Siliguri
Katihar railway division
Railway stations in Darjeeling district
Railway stations in India opened in 1880
Transport in Siliguri